Richard Muckerman (April 9, 1897 – March 15, 1959) was a 1912 graduate from Western Military Academy in Alton, Illinois. He was the owner of the St. Louis Browns of the American League from  through .  He sold the Browns to Bill DeWitt after the 1948 season.  Muckerman died of a heart attack in 1959.

1897 births
1959 deaths
Major League Baseball owners
St. Louis Browns owners
Businesspeople from St. Louis
20th-century American businesspeople